John Francis Geiger (March 28, 1873 in Philadelphia – December 6, 1956 in Philadelphia) was an American rower who competed in the 1900 Summer Olympics. He was part of the American boat Vesper Boat Club, which won the gold medal in the eights.

References

External links
 
 

1873 births
1956 deaths
Rowers from Philadelphia
Rowers at the 1900 Summer Olympics
Olympic gold medalists for the United States in rowing
American male rowers
Medalists at the 1900 Summer Olympics